Azad University Team was an Iranian UCI Continental cycling team based in Islamic Azad University, Tehran, Iran; the team was founded in 2007 and disbanded in 2013, before restarting in 2021.

Major wins 

2007
Stage 4 Kerman Tour, Hassan Maleki
Stage 6 Kerman Tour, Seyed Moezeddin Seyed
Stage 1 Azerbaijan Tour, Farshad Salehian
Stage 7 Azerbaijan Tour, Seyed Moezeddin Seyed
Stage 1 Tour of East Java, Mehdi Sohrabi
Stage 1, 6 & 7 Tour of Milad du Nour, Mehdi Sohrabi
Stage 2 Tour of Milad du Nour, Amir Zargari
Stage 6 Tour de Hokkaido, Mehdi Sohrabi
2008
Stage 1 President Tour of Iran, Abbas Saeidi
Stage 2 President Tour of Iran, Mehdi Sohrabi
Stage 1, 5 & 6 Azerbaijan Tour, Mehdi Sohrabi
Prologue Kerman Tour, Seyed Mostafa Seyed
Stage 1 Kerman Tour, Abbas Saeidi
2009
Stage 6 Tour of Thailand, Hossein Nateghi
Stage 3 & 8 Jelajah Malaysia, Hossein Nateghi
Stage 4 & 5 Jelajah Malaysia, Anuar Manan
Stage 4 Tour de Singkarak, Hossein Nateghi
Stage 4 President Tour of Iran, Evgeny Vakker
Stage 5 President Tour of Iran, Hossein Nateghi
 Road Race Championship, Evgeny Vakker
 Time Trial Championship, Evgeny Vakker
Overall Perlis Open, Anuar Manan
Stage 1, Anuar Manan
Stage 1 Azerbaijan Tour, Rasoul Barati
Stage 3 Azerbaijan Tour, Hossein Nateghi
Stage 5 Tour d'Indonesia, Abbas Saeidi
2010
Overall Kerman Tour, Abbas Saeidi
Stage 1, Team Time Trial
Stage 2, Abbas Saeidi
Stage 5, Hossein Nateghi
Stage 2 Azerbaijan Tour, Amir Zargari
Stage 5 President Tour of Iran, Abbas Saeidi
Stage 2b & 4 Tour of Singkarak, Amir Zargari
Overall Tour of Milad du Nour, Ramin Mehrabani
Stage 1, Hossein Nateghi
Stage 2, Ramin Mehrabani
2011
Overall Tour de Filipinas, Rahim Ememi
Stages 1 & 4, Rahim Ememi
Stage 3, Mirsamad Pourseyedi
Overall Tour of Singkarak, Amir Zargari
Stages 2 & 5, Amir Zargari
Stages 3, 6b & 7a, Mirsamad Pourseyedi
 Road Race Championships, Abbas Saeidi
2012
 Time Trial Championships, Alireza Haghi
Stage 6 Tour de Taiwan, Victor Niño
Overall Tour de Singkarak, Óscar Pujol
Stage 3, Óscar Pujol
2013
 Time Trial Championships, Behnam Khalili
U23 Asian Cycling Championship Road Race, Ali Khademi
2021
 Road Race Championships, BBehnam Khalilikhosroshahi

Team roster
As of 23 January 2013.

References

External links
 UCI.ch

UCI Continental Teams (Asia)
Cycling teams based in Iran
Cycling teams established in 2007